Turori is a panchayat village of Omerga, Osmanabad, Maharashtra, India. It is very famous for chewing paan. The village is also awarded for Tanta Mukta Village.

Geography
Turori has a moderate temperature. It varies from season to season. 
Villages in Osmanabad district